Gymnophryxe theodori is a Palaearctic species of tachinid flies in the genus Gymnophryxe of the family Tachinidae.

Distribution
Palaearctic: China, Iran, Israel, Transcaucasia.

References

Diptera of Asia
Exoristinae
Insects described in 1968